The 2006 AIHL season was the seventh season of the Australian Ice Hockey League (AIHL). It ran from 8 April 2006 until 27 August 2006, with the Goodall Cup finals following on 2 and 3 September 2006. The Melbourne Ice won the V.I.P. Cup after finishing the regular season first in the league standings. The Newcastle North Stars won the Goodall Cup for the third time by defeating the Adelaide Avalanche in the final.

Regular season 
The regular season began on 8 April 2006 and ran through to 27 August 2006 before the top four teams advanced to compete in the Goodall Cup playoff series.

Standings 

Source

Statistics

Scoring leaders 
List shows the ten top skaters sorted by points, then goals. Current as of 3 September 2006

Leading goaltenders 
Only the top five goaltenders, based on save percentage with a minimum 40% of the team's ice time. Current as of 3 September 2006

Goodall Cup playoffs 

The 2006 playoffs was scheduled for 2 September with the Goodall Cup final held on 3 September 2006. Following the end of the regular season the top four teams advanced to the playoff series which was held at the IceArenA in Adelaide, South Australia. The series was a single game elimination with the two winning semi-finalists advancing to the Goodall Cup final. The Goodall Cup was won by Newcastle North Stars (3rd title) who defeated host team the Adelaide Avalanche 4–0 in the final.

All times are UTC+10:00

Semi-finals

Final

References

External links 
 Official AIHL website

AIHL 2006 season
AIHL
Australian Ice Hockey League seasons